Carlo Crivelli (Venice, c. 1430 – Ascoli Piceno, c. 1495) was an Italian Renaissance painter of conservative Late Gothic decorative sensibility, who spent his early years in the Veneto, where he absorbed influences from the Vivarini, Squarcione, and Mantegna. He left the Veneto by 1458 and spent most of the remainder of his career in the March of Ancona, where he developed a distinctive personal style that contrasts with that of his Venetian contemporary Giovanni Bellini.

Early life 
Crivelli was born around 1430–35 in Venice to a family of painters and received his artistic formation there and in Padua. The details of Crivelli's career are still sparse: He is said to have studied under Jacobello del Fiore, who was painting as late as 1436; at that time Crivelli was probably only a boy. He also studied at the school of Vivarini in Venice, then left Venice for Padua, where he is believed to have worked in the workshop of Francesco Squarcione and then,  after being sentenced in 1457 to a six-month prison term for an affair with a married woman, left in 1459 for Zadar in Dalmatia (now part of Croatia, but then a Venetian territory).

Career 

He was master of his own shop when sent to prison for adultery in 1457. The dates he signed on the pictures that survive extend from 1468 on an altarpiece in the church of San Silvestro at Massa Fermana near Fermo to 1493 on The Dead Christ between St John, the Virgin and Mary Magdalene in Milan's Brera Gallery.

Though the artist advertised his Venetian origins with his signature, often some variation on Carolus Crivellus Venetos ("Carlo Crivelli of Venice"), Crivelli seems to have worked chiefly in the March of Ancona, and especially in and near Ascoli Piceno. Only two pictures can be found today in Venice, both in the church of San Sebastiano.

He painted in tempera only, despite the increasing popularity of oil painting during his lifetime, and on panels, though some of his paintings have been transferred to canvas. His predilection for decoratively punched gilded backgrounds is one of the marks of this conservative taste, in part imposed by his patrons. Of his early polyptychs, only one, the altarpiece from Ascoli Piceno, dated 1473, survives in its entirety in its original frame, and still in its original location (the city's Cathedral). All the others have been disassembled and their panels and predella scenes are divided among several museums.

An amorphous band of contemporaries, imitators and followers, termed Crivelleschi, reflect to varying degrees aspects of his style.

Work 

Unlike the naturalistic trends arising in Florence during his lifetime, Crivelli's style continues to represent the courtly International Gothic sensibility. His urban settings are jewel-like and full of elaborate allegorical detail. He favored verdant landscape backgrounds, and his works can be identified by his characteristic use of fruits and flowers as decorative motifs, often depicted in pendant festoons, which are also a hallmark of the Paduan studio of Francesco Squarcione, where Crivelli may have worked.

His paintings have a linear quality identified with his Umbrian contemporaries. Crivelli is a painter of marked individuality. Unlike Giovanni Bellini, his contemporary, his works are not "soft", but clear and definite in contour with marked attention to detail.  His use of trompe-l'œil, often compared with that found in the works of Northern Renaissance painters like Rogier van der Weyden, includes raised objects, such as jewels and armor modeled in gesso on the panel.

Commissioned by the Franciscans and Dominicans of Ascoli, Crivelli's work is exclusively religious in nature.  His paintings consist largely of Madonna and Child images, Pietà, and the altarpieces known as polyptychs that were increasingly unfashionable. Often filled with images of suffering, such as gaping wounds in Christ's hands and side and the mouths of mourners twisted in agony, Crivelli's work fulfills the spiritual needs of his patrons. These ultra-realistic, sometimes disturbing qualities have often led critics to label Crivelli's paintings "grotesque", much like his fellow Northern Italian painter, Cosimo Tura. His work attracted numerous prestigious commissions and must have appealed to the taste of his patrons.

Carlo Crivelli died in the Marche (probably Ascoli Piceno) around 1495. Vittorio Crivelli, with whom he occasionally collaborated, was his younger brother. Pietro Alemanno, a painter who immigrated to the March of Ancona from Germany/Austria, was his pupil and collaborator.  Donato Crivelli, who was also a pupil of Jacobello and was working in 1459, may be of the same family as Carlo.

Reputation 

His work fell out of favor following his death and Vasari's Lives of the Most Excellent Painters, Sculptors, and Architects, which is notably Florentine in its outlook, does not mention him. He had something of a revival, especially in the UK, during the time of the pre-Raphaelite painters, several of whom, including Edward Burne-Jones, admired his work. His reputation faded with that movement, but recent writings on his work and a rehanging of his work in the National Gallery, London, have brought him renewed attention.

Susan Sontag in Notes on "Camp" (1992) wrote: "Camp is the paintings of Carlo Crivelli, with their real jewels and trompe-l'œil insects and cracks in the masonry."

Works 
1472 Altarpiece, now divided up between a number of galleries in the United States and Europe.
Adoration of the Shepherds, Musée des Beaux-Arts de Strasbourg
The Annunciation, with Saint Emidius, 1486, National Gallery, London. Possibly his most famous painting.
An Apostle, c. 1471–73, Metropolitan Museum of Art, New York
Ascoli Piceno Altarpiece (or Saint Emidius Altarpiece), 1472–73, Cathedral of Saint Emidius, Ascoli Piceno. The only altarpiece entirely surviving, with its original XVth century carved wooden frame.
Beato Ferretti, 1489, National Gallery, London
Dead Christ, Vatican Gallery
Enthroned Madonna, St. Jerome and St. Sebastian, 1490
The Immaculate Conception, 1492
Lamentation over the Dead Christ, 1485, Museum of Fine Arts, Boston
Madonna and Child, 1480, Metropolitan Museum of Art, New York
Madonna and Child, 1460, Verona
Madonna and Child, 1480–1486, AnconaMadonna and Child, Church of San Giacomo Maggiore in MassignanoMadonna and Child Enthroned, 1472, Metropolitan Museum of Art, New YorkMadonna and Child with Saints, 1490Madonna and Saints, 1491, BerlinMadonna of the Candle, Brera of MilanMadonna of Poggio Bretta, c.1472, 71x50 cm, Ascoli Piceno, Diocesan Museum of Ascoli Piceno
Madonna with child and saints, Monte San Martino in MarcheMary Magdalene, 1480, Rijksmuseum, AmsterdamPietà, 1476, Metropolitan Museum of Art, New YorkSaint Dominic, 1472, Metropolitan Museum of Art, New YorkSaint Francis with the Blood of Christ, 1480-1486Saint George Slaying the Dragon, 1470Saint James Major, part of an altarpiece, 1472, Brooklyn MuseumSaint Stephen from the Demidoff Altarpiece, 1476, National Gallery, LondonSan Giacomo, 1472 :it:San Giacomo (Carlo Crivelli)St Thomas Aquinas, 1476, National Gallery, LondonVirgin and Child with Saints Francis and Sebastian, 1491Virgin Annunciate, 1482, Frankfurt
Another of his principal pictures is in San Francesco di Matelica.

 Gallery of paintings 

 See also 
Crivelli carpet
Huldschinsky Madonna (painting)

 Notes 

 Sources Encyclopedia of Artists, volume 2, edited by William H.T. Vaughan, 2000, Italian Art'', edited by Gloria Fossi, 2000

External links

Carlo Crivelli at the Web Gallery of Art
Carlo Crivelli at the National Gallery, London
"Carlo Crivelli, The Annunciation, with Saint Emidius", The National Gallery, London,
smARThistory: Madonna and Child
Italian Paintings in the Robert Lehman Collection, plates 92–93, index
Works at Open Library

Italian Renaissance painters
Quattrocento painters
Painters from Venice
1430s births
1495 deaths
Italian male painters
15th-century Italian painters
15th-century Venetian people
Trompe-l'œil artists
Catholic painters